The house at 50 Pelham Street in Methuen, Massachusetts is a well-preserved Italianate house and barn.  Built sometime in the 1870s, the -story wood-frame house features typical Italianate decorations, including extended bracketed eaves (not just on the roof but also on projecting window lintels), doubled brackets in the gable eaves, and a round-arch window in the gable end.  The barn at the back of the property is a simple wood-frame structure that appears to date to the same period as the house.

The house was added to the National Register of Historic Places in 1984.

See also
 National Register of Historic Places listings in Methuen, Massachusetts
 National Register of Historic Places listings in Essex County, Massachusetts

References

Houses in Methuen, Massachusetts
National Register of Historic Places in Methuen, Massachusetts
Houses on the National Register of Historic Places in Essex County, Massachusetts
Italianate architecture in Massachusetts
1870s establishments in Massachusetts
Buildings and structures completed in the 1870s